Félix de Azúa Comella (Barcelona, 30 April 1944) is a Spanish professor of aesthetics and philosophy, poet, novelist, essayist and translator, member of Real Academia Española.

He taught Spanish literature at the University of Oxford from 1979 to 1981. He was director of the Institut Cervantes in Paris. With Eduardo Mendoza Garriga, Manuel Vázquez Montalbán, José Angel Valente, Antonio Gamoneda, Pere Gimferrer, Julián Ríos and others, he is part of the generation of writers who revived democratic Spain.

He was elected to Seat H of the Real Academia Española on 18 June 2015; he took up his seat on 13 March 2016.

References

External links

Félix de Azúa's blog on El Boomeran(g).  (literary blog)
Articles by Félix de Azúa on Elpais.com
 by Agrupación de Jóvenes de Ciudadanos (C's). Barcelona, 6 Feb 2008 [35 min.]
Entrevista a Félix de Azúa by Emili Manzano in L'hora del lector. Barcelona: TV3, 21 May 2010 [1 h. 1 min.]
Entrevista a Félix de Azúa by Ignacio Vidal-Folch in Nostromo. Madrid: RTVE, 28 Oct 2010 [59 min.]
Poems by Félix de Azúa
Ficha de Félix de Azúa Comella
Ficha de Félix de Azúa Comella en Dialnet
Premio Internazionale Sebetia-Ter. Elenco de premiados

Living people
1944 births
Members of the Royal Spanish Academy
Spanish poets
Spanish male poets
Academic staff of the Polytechnic University of Catalonia